Daniel Ira Sharp (born February 5, 1962) is a former American football tight end who played for the Atlanta Falcons of the National Football League (NFL). He played college football at TCU.

Personal life
Dan and his wife Cindy have two daughters Alexandra and Andrea.

References 

Living people
American football tight ends
TCU Horned Frogs football players
TCU Horned Frogs football coaches
1962 births
Atlanta Falcons players